Bymarka is a large park and nature reserve on the west side of the city of Trondheim in Trøndelag county, Norway.

Location and use 

Bymarka is very popular for cross-country skiing in the winter, and for walks, hiking or jogging in the summer. There is a golf course on the fringe near the city. Bymarka borders the Byåsen district, and can be reached by the Gråkall Line tram line or by car.

Forests and habitats 

There are more than 10 lakes, and many bogs. However, Bymarka is largely covered with forest, much of it planted between the years 1870 and 1940. Some non-native trees were planted, such as European Larch and Douglas fir, and there is also Sycamore maple and European ash at the lowest elevations. The most common tree species are the native Norway spruce, Scots pine and Downy birch. As there are no higher mountains nearby, there is a nice view over Trondheim, the fjord, and mountain ranges including Trollheimen to the south and Sylane (which is partly in Sweden) to the east.

Part of the northern area of Bymarka is protected and preserved as a nature reserve, stretching from an elevation of around  near Herbernheia and northwards down towards the fjord. The lowland on the southern (Gaulosen) and western (Byneset) fringes of Bymarka contains areas of more southern hemiboreal vegetation. One of these locations has an especially rich understory, and has traditionally been used by the locals for collecting plants believed to have medical properties, hence the name Apoteket (The Pharmacy).

Fauna 
Moose, red fox, hare and squirrel are the most common animals, but there are also healthy populations of roe deer, beaver, badger and also some otters. As of spring 2006, even one wolverine has been verified as living in Bymarka, which is rare, as this elusive predator usually stays in the higher mountains, far from any cities. There are trout in many lakes, and a rich bird life.

References

Geography of Trondheim
Forests and woodlands of Norway